Chen Xinyi (born January 2, 1998) is a Chinese competitive swimmer, swimming freestyle, butterfly and individual medley.

Career
At the 2014 Asian Games, she won gold medals in the 50 metre freestyle, 100 metre butterfly  and 4 × 100 m freestyle relay.

Failed doping test
While swimming for the Chinese national team at the 2016 Summer Olympics, Xinyi tested positive for hydrochlorothiazide, a banned substance. Following this, she was suspended from competition in the 2016 Summer Olympics by the Court of Arbitration for Sport. The International Swimming Federation Doping Panel decided to impose on her a period of two years’ ineligibility, from August 11, 2016 to August 10, 2018 for her first anti-doping rule violation.

Personal bests (long course)

References

External links
 Chen Xinyi's Weibo

1998 births
Living people
Swimmers from Shanghai
Chinese female medley swimmers
Chinese female freestyle swimmers
Chinese female butterfly swimmers
Olympic swimmers of China
Swimmers at the 2016 Summer Olympics
Asian Games gold medalists for China
Asian Games medalists in swimming
Swimmers at the 2014 Asian Games
World Aquatics Championships medalists in swimming
Doping cases in swimming
Chinese sportspeople in doping cases
Medalists at the 2014 Asian Games
21st-century Chinese women